Castle Fraser is the most elaborate Z-plan castle in Scotland and one of the grandest 'Castles of Mar'. It is located near Kemnay in the Aberdeenshire region of Scotland. There is archaeological evidence of an older square tower dating from around 1400 or 1500 within the current construction. The castle is a Category A listed building and the grounds are included in the Inventory of Gardens and Designed Landscapes in Scotland.

Construction

Originally known as Muchall-in-Mar, construction of the elaborate, five-storey Z-plan castle was begun in 1575 by the 6th Laird of Fraser, Michael Fraser, on the basis of an earlier tower, and was completed in 1636. A panel on the northern side of the castle is signed "I Bel", believed to be the mark of the master mason John Bell of Midmar, the castle is a joint creation over several decades with another master mason of this period, Thomas Leiper.

Castle Fraser is contemporary with other nearby castles: Craigievar Castle, Crathes Castle and Midmar Castle which are also believed to have been designed by the Bell family of master masons.

The castle was modernised in a classical style in the late 18th century, with a new entrance inserted in the south side and sash windows throughout. This work was supervised by Elyza Fraser, the lady laird, assisted by Mary Bristow. Elyza was also responsible for the landscaping of the grounds, sweeping away the remains of the original formal gardens and orchards, and for the construction of the impressive octagonal stable block.

The interiors of the building were entirely reconstructed again between 1820 and 1850, by Charles Fraser, using the architects John Smith and William Burn. The Library is a fine example of John Smith's regency style with Tudor detailing. Many of William Burn's more extravagant Gothic designs for the most important rooms were not carried out, although a Gothic-style pipe organ was installed (now removed to Kemnay Church).

External works during this period included the construction of the twin gatehouses (still extant), and a grand domed stair and access corridors with loggias in the courtyard (removed).
The castle was partially restored by the new owners around 1950. The architect and antiquary Dr William Kelly supervised the removal of much 19th-century work to reveal the earlier fabric.

Castle Fraser retains the atmosphere of a family home and still contains the original contents, including Fraser family portraits, furniture and collections. The evocative interiors represent all periods of the castle's history, from the Medieval stone vaulted Great Hall to the Regency Dining Room.

Ownership

Castle Fraser was built as the home of the Frasers of Muchalls, later Frasers of Castle Fraser. The castle was passed down through the Lords Fraser, the Frasers of Inverallochy and then the Mackenzie family who took the name Mackenzie Fraser. In 1897 the last male Fraser of the direct line, Frederick Mackenzie Fraser, died childless. In 1921 his widow, Theodora, sold the castle due to the lack of a suitable heir and mounting financial difficulties.  The buyer was Weetman Pearson, 1st Viscount Cowdray. The Pearson family restored the castle as a shooting lodge and gave it to the National Trust for Scotland in 1976.  The Trust now opens the castle to visitors all year round along with the grounds and walled garden. During 2019, the site received 56,822 visitors.

In film
Some scenes in the 2006 film The Queen, starring Dame Helen Mirren, featured Castle Fraser as a backdrop.

See also
 Miranda, Countess of Iveagh

References

Secondary sources

External links

 NTS Castle Fraser Webpage
  Take a Virtual Tour of Castle Fraser Grounds

Fraser
Category A listed buildings in Aberdeenshire
Listed castles in Scotland
National Trust for Scotland properties
Castle Fraser
Inventory of Gardens and Designed Landscapes
Gardens in Aberdeenshire
Historic house museums in Aberdeenshire
Tower houses in Scotland